General Dickson may refer to:

Alexander Dickson (British Army officer) (1777–1840), British Army major general
Collingwood Dickson (1817–1904), British Army general
David C. Dickson (Mississippi politician) (died 1836), Mississippi Militia brigadier general
Edward Thompson Dickson (1850–1938), British Army major general
Jeremiah Dickson (c. 1775–1848), British Army major general
Tracy Campbell Dickson (1868–1936), U.S. Army brigadier general

See also
General Dixon (disambiguation)